Richard Storry Deans (1868 – 31 August 1938) was a British politician.

Storry Deans studied at the University of London and then at Gray's Inn.  He joined the Conservative Party, and was narrowly elected when he stood as its candidate in Sheffield Park at the 1923 general election.  He increased his majority in 1924, but lost the seat in 1929.

References

External links 
 

1868 births
1938 deaths
Politics of Sheffield
Conservative Party (UK) MPs for English constituencies
UK MPs 1923–1924
UK MPs 1924–1929
Members of Gray's Inn